In medicine, a polypectomy is the removal of an abnormal growth of tissue called a polyp. Polypectomy can be performed by excision if the polyp is external (on the skin).

See also
 Colonic polypectomy
 Non-lifting sign

References

Surgical procedures and techniques